Sylvia Alice Earle (née Reade; born August 30, 1935) is an American marine biologist, oceanographer, explorer, author, and lecturer. She has been a National Geographic explorer-in-residence since 1998. Earle was the first female chief scientist of the U.S. National Oceanic and Atmospheric Administration, and was named by Time Magazine as its first Hero for the Planet in 1998.

Earle is part of the group Ocean Elders, which is dedicated to protecting the ocean and its wildlife.

Earle gained a large amount of publicity when she was featured in Seaspiracy (2021), a Netflix Original documentary by British filmmaker Ali Tabrizi.

Earle eats a vegetarian diet. She describes the chemical buildup in carnivorous fish, the 90% depletion of populations of large fish, and references the health of oceans in her dietary decision. Also, she describes the seafood industry as “factory ships vacuuming up fish and everything else in their path. That’s like using bulldozers to kill songbirds…”.

In a discussion at the Good Food Conference in California, Earle warns of disappearing fish stocks, and that while coastal people’s diets have included seafood for centuries, the commercial fishing industry no longer makes sense. She encourages transitions to plant-based diets as a solution.

Early life and education

Earle was born in 1935 in the Gibbstown section of Greenwich Township, Gloucester County, New Jersey, to Alice Freas (Richie) Earle and Lewis Reade. Both her parents were enthusiastic about the outdoors and supportive of their daughter's early interests in the natural world. The family moved to Dunedin on the western coast of Florida during Earle's childhood. Earle received an associate degree from St. Petersburg Jr. College (1952), a Bachelor of Science degree from Florida State University (1955), a Master of Science (1956) and a Doctorate of Phycology (1966) from Duke University.

Career
Earle was a Radcliffe Institute Scholar (1967–1969). Earle was a research fellow at Harvard University (1967–1981). After receiving her Ph.D. in 1966, Earle spent a year as a research fellow at Harvard, then returned to Florida as the resident director of the Cape Haze Marine Laboratory. 

Earle was a research associate at the University of California, Berkeley (1969–1981). In 1969, she applied to join the Tektite Project, an installation fifty feet below the surface of the sea off the coast of the Virgin Islands which allowed scientists to live submersed in their area of study for up to several weeks. Although she had logged more than 1,000 research hours underwater, Earle was rejected from the program. The next year, she was selected to lead the first all-female team of aquanauts in Tektite II.

Earle was the Curator of Phycology at the California Academy of Sciences (1979–1986). In 1979, she made an open-ocean JIM suit dive, untethered, to the sea ocean floor near Oahu. In 1979 she also began her tenure as the Curator of Phycology at the California Academy of Sciences, where she served until 1986.

From 1980 to 1984, she served on the National Advisory Committee on Oceans and Atmosphere.

In 1982 she and her later husband, Graham Hawkes, an engineer and submersible designer, founded Deep Ocean Engineering to design, operate, support and consult on piloted and robotic subsea systems. By 1986, Deep Rover had been tested and Earle joined the team conducting training off Lee Stocking Island in the Bahamas.

Earle left the company in 1990 to accept an appointment as Chief Scientist at the National Oceanic and Atmospheric Administration, where she stayed until 1992. She was the first woman to hold that position. During this post, given her expertise on the impact of oil spills, Earle was called upon to lead several research trips during the Persian Gulf War in 1991 to determine the environmental damage caused by Iraq's destruction of Kuwaiti oil wells.

In 1992, Earle founded Deep Ocean Exploration and Research (DOER Marine) to further advance marine engineering. The company, now run by Earle's daughter Elizabeth, designs, builds, and operates equipment for deep-ocean environments.

Since 1998, Earle has been a National Geographic Explorer-in-Residence. She is sometimes called "Her Deepness" or "The Sturgeon General".

From 1998 to 2002, she led the Sustainable Seas Expeditions, a five-year program sponsored by the National Geographic Society and funded by the Richard and Rhoda Goldman Fund to study the United States National Marine Sanctuary. During this time, Earle was a leader of the Sustainable Seas Expeditions, council chair for the Harte Research Institute for the Gulf of Mexico Studies at Texas A&M-Corpus Christi, and chair of the Advisory Council for the Ocean in Google Earth. She also provided the DeepWorker 2000 submersible used to quantify the species of fish as well as the space resources utilized within the Stellwagen Bank National Marine Sanctuary.

In 2001, Earle received the National Parks Conservation Association's Robin W. Winks Award For Enhancing Public Understanding of National Parks.

Earle founded Mission Blue (also known as the Sylvia Earle Alliance, Deep Search Foundation, and Deep Search) in 2009.

In 2009, she also received the million dollar TED prize which allowed her to continue her ocean advocacy work.

Given her past experience with the Exxon Valdez and Mega Borg oil spills, Earle was called to consult during the Deepwater Horizon Disaster in the Gulf of Mexico in 2010. During this year she also gave a 14-minute speech in front of 3,500 delegates and United Nations ambassadors at The Hague International Model United Nations Conference.

In July 2012, Earle led an expedition to NOAA's Aquarius underwater laboratory, located off Key Largo, Florida. The expedition, entitled "Celebrating 50 Years of Living Beneath The Sea", commemorated the fiftieth anniversary of Jacques Cousteau's Conshelf I project and investigated coral reefs and ocean health. Mark Patterson co-led the expedition with Earle. Their aquanaut team also included underwater filmmaker D.J. Roller and oceanographer M. Dale Suckers.

Earle made a cameo appearance in the daily cartoon strip Sherman's Lagoon in the week starting September 17, 2012, to discuss the closing of the Aquarius Underwater Laboratory.

In May 2013, the Science Laureates of the United States Act of 2013 (H.R. 1891; 113th Congress) was introduced into Congress. Earle was listed by one commentator as a possible nominee for the position of Science Laureate, if the act were to pass.

In January 2018, the Seattle Aquarium granted its inaugural Lifetime Achievement Award to Earle and renamed the Seattle Aquarium Medal in her honor. The Aquarium's first Lifetime Achievement Award was awarded to Earle.

Alongside her work at Mission Blue, she also serves on several boards, including the Marine Conservation Institute.

With TED's support, she launched Mission Blue, which aims to establish marine protected areas (dubbed "Hope Spots") around the globe. Mission Blue's vision is to achieve 30% protection of the ocean by 2030, and more than two hundred organisations have supported them in this mission to date (2019). These supporters range from large, global companies to small, bespoke research teams.

With Mission Blue and its partners, Earle leads expeditions to Hope Spots around the globe. The organization has continued to grow with Earle's work and the help of her team. As of 2020, Mission Blue has created 122 Hope Spots around the world. Past expeditions include Cuba in 2009, Belize in January 2010, the Galápagos Islands in April 2010, Costa Rica and the Central American Dome in early 2014 and the South African Coast in late 2014. A series of geographic information StoryMaps are available through ESRI’s ArcGIS which illustrate examples of Mission Blue hope spots around the world in great detail including: 1 Tribugá Gulf Hope Spot, 2 Little Cayman Hope Spot, and 3 Galápagos National Park Expedition. In August 2014, a Netflix exclusive documentary titled 'Mission Blue' was released. It focuses on Earle's life and career as her Mission Blue campaign to create a global network of marine protected areas.

In 2016, Earle appeared in the featurette Plankton Rules the World!, which coincided with The SpongeBob Movie: Sponge Out of Water. The featurette was shown at the Arlington Theater in Santa Barbara.

In the 2019 article California Seamounts Are Sylvia Earle’s Newest “Hope Spots” featured in Hakai Magazine, Hope Spots are described as “areas critical to the health of the ocean for any number of reasons: an abundance or diversity of species, a unique habitat or ecosystem, or significant cultural or economic value to a community.” Seamounts are also described as destinations for mining companies in search of undersea precious metals.

In January 2020, Aurora Expeditions announced their second ship would be named The Sylvia Earle after the marine biologist.

Earle is one of the supporters of the 30X30 movement; one which aims to protect 30% of seawaters by 2030, which would be a significant increase from only 6% (as of 2021).

Accomplishments and honors

 1970: U.S. Department of Interior Conservation Service Award and Los Angeles Times Woman of the Year
 1976: NOGI Award for Science
 1980: Explorers Club Lowell Thomas Award
 1981: Ordained as a Knight of the Order of the Golden Ark by the Prince of the Netherlands
 1986: Set the women's record for a world solo dive depth and tie the overall record with Graham Hawkes
 1990: Society of Woman Geographers gold medal
 1991: American Academy of Achievement Golden Plate Award
 1996: Lindbergh Foundation award, the Explorers Club Medal and Zonta International Honorary Member
 1997: SeaKeeper Award at The International SeaKeepers Society's Bal de la Mer
 1998: UN Global 500 Laureate and National Wildlife Federation Conservationist of the Year
 2000: National Women's Hall of Fame, Library of Congress Living Legend, Women Divers Hall of Fame
 2001: Robin W. Winks Award For Enhancing Public Understanding of National Parks
 2004: International Banksia Award, the Richard Hopper Day Memorial Medal from the Philadelphia Academy of Sciences, and the Barnard College medal
 2005: John P. McGovern Science and Society Award from Sigma Xi
 2009: Artiglio Award (Premio Artiglio 2009) and TED Prize
 2009: The National Audubon Society's prestigious Rachel Carson Award, a premier award honoring distinguished American women environmentalists.
 2010: The Roy Chapman Andrews Distinguished Explorer Award from the Roy Chapman Andrews Society in Beloit, WI.
 2010: Carl Sagan Award for Public Understanding of Science
 2011: Honorary doctorate from Smith College and commencement address at Warren Wilson College, Medal of Honor from the Dominican Republic
 2013: Honorary doctorate from the Nelson Mandela Metropolitan University and the Hubbard Medal, the National Geographic Society's highest honor, "for distinction in exploration, discovery and research"
 2014: Walter Cronkite Award, UN Lifetime Achievement Award (Champions of the Earth), Glamour Woman of the Year, and the first woman to be celebrated at an Explorers Club Tribute Ceremony
 2017: Rachel Carson Prize, Lewis Thomas Prize.
 2017: The Perfect World Foundation Award The Conservationist of the year 2017 & the Prize "The Fragile Rhino"
 2018: Seattle Aquarium Lifetime Achievement Award
 2018: Princess of Asturias Award of Concord (Concordia)
 2018: Doctor of Science from the University of Edinburgh
2020: Aurora Expeditions announced their expedition ship would be named the Sylvia Earle.

Publications

Earle has authored more than 150 publications.
 
 
 
 
 
 
 
 
 
 
 
 Co-author (2011). The Protection and Management of the Sargasso Sea: The golden floating rainforest of the Atlantic Ocean. Summary Science and Supporting Evidence Case. Sargasso Sea Alliance.
 Earle, Sylvia (2012). The Sweet Spot in Time. Why the Ocean Matters to Everyone, Everywhere. Virginia Quarterly Review, Fall.

References

External links

 National Geographic Profile
 Sylvia Earle on Literati.net 
 Get to Know a Frog or a Worm, or a Fish Says Sylvia Earle, at SeniorWomenWeb
 Sylvia Earle interview by impactmania
 
 TED Prize Wish: Sylvia Earle's TED Prize wish to protect our oceans (TED2009)

Video

 
 
 

1935 births
Living people
American oceanographers
Aquanauts
Duke University alumni
Florida State University alumni
Harvard Fellows
People from Greenwich Township, Gloucester County, New Jersey
University of California, Berkeley staff
Women marine biologists
American environmentalists
American women environmentalists
Writers from Oakland, California
Female explorers
American explorers
Professional divers
Members of the Society of Woman Geographers
Women oceanographers
Conservation biologists
20th-century American biologists
20th-century earth scientists
20th-century American women scientists
21st-century American biologists
21st-century earth scientists
21st-century American women scientists
Scientists from New Jersey
Scientists from Florida